GoJet Airlines LLC is a regional airline headquartered in Bridgeton, Missouri, United States. Wholly owned by Trans States Holdings, it has 1,670 employees. It operates commuter feeder services under the United Express brand of United Airlines. United Express flights are currently operated out of United's hubs at Chicago–O'Hare, Newark and Washington-Dulles. GoJet's Delta Connection branded flights came to an end on March 31, 2020.  Most of the flying at the end of the agreement was out of Detroit and Minneapolis–St. Paul as well as Raleigh-Durham. GoJet Airlines' system operations center (SOC), training center and corporate offices are co-located in the former Trans World Airlines and Ozark Airlines training center in Bridgeton, Missouri. The airline uses the former McDonnell Douglas factory hangar at Saint Louis Lambert International Airport as its primary maintenance facility, with maintenance staff available at all of the airline's destinations. Its call sign, "Lindbergh", is named for aviation pioneer Charles Lindbergh, who flew the Spirit of St. Louis solo across the Atlantic Ocean in 1927: the first person to do so.

History

The airline was established in late 2004 by Trans States Holdings. The airline would fly United Express-branded flights out of United Airlines' Chicago O’Hare hub to replace departing United Express carrier Atlantic Coast Airlines. GoJet took delivery of its first Bombardier CRJ-700 in June, 2005.

The airline received its initial Air Carrier Operating Certificate in September 2005 and began scheduled passenger services on October 4, 2005, with a United Express flight from Cincinnati, Ohio to Chicago, Illinois. By the end of 2009, GoJet took delivery of its 25th CRJ-700 aircraft.

In October, 2011, Delta Air Lines announced that it was planning a January, 2012 launch of new GoJet CRJ-700 service as a Delta Connection regional carrier. Delta would initially transfer 15 of the CRJ-700 aircraft previously assigned to its Comair division to GoJet, as well as 12 owned or leased CRJ700s contracted to SkyWest Airlines, to begin the service. On January 22, 2012, GoJet began service as a Delta Connection carrier with its inaugural flight from St. Louis, Missouri to Detroit, Michigan. In late 2013, GoJet agreed to increase its flying agreement for Delta by leasing several CRJ-900 aircraft for its Delta Connection service through 2023. GoJet began this CRJ-900 service in late 2014.

In August, 2019, Delta announced that it would be terminating operating agreements with two of its Delta Connection-branded carriers: GoJet Airlines and Compass Airlines. The CRJ-700 aircraft operated by GoJet for Delta Air Lines will be transferred to Endeavor Air or sold to other operators. The CRJ-900 aircraft that were leased by GoJet for the Delta Connection brand were also eventually re-leased by other Delta Connection carriers. As part of the announcement, all GoJet operated flights on behalf of Delta Air Lines were phased out by mid-2020. After the COVID-19 pandemic nearly reduced travel demand to zero bookings Delta Air Lines and GoJet Airlines agreed to terminate service early and park all remaining Delta Connection aircraft on March 31, 2020.

In April, 2020 Trans States Holdings closed GoJet's two sister airlines, Trans States Airlines and Compass Airlines, due to challenging economic issues and an unsustainable business environment related to the COVID-19 pandemic.

Crew Bases
Pilots and flight attendants as well as maintenance personnel are based at the following locations:
Chicago, Illinois (O'Hare International Airport)
St. Louis, Missouri (St. Louis Lambert International Airport)
Newark, New Jersey (Newark Liberty International Airport)
Richmond, Virginia (Richmond International Airport)

Destinations
GoJet flies to over 80 destinations within the United States and Canada, operating for United Express. Below are destinations per a 2017 route map.

Fleet

Current fleet

As of March 2023, the GoJet Airlines fleet consists of the following aircraft:

The GoJet fleet of CRJ-700's that are flown for United Express are equipped with engines like those on the Bombardier CRJ-700 series and the CRJ-900 series:  the General Electric CF34-8C5B1. All of these aircraft are being converted to CRJ550s (see below). GoJet operated CRJ-900 aircraft from 2014 to 2020 that it leased as a former Delta Air Lines commuter partner.  At the beginning of April 2020, GoJet stopped flying the CRJ-900 when the company completed its service contract with Delta Air Lines.

Fleet development
On February 6, 2019, United Airlines and Bombardier Aviation announced that GoJet would be the first regional carrier to operate 54 CRJ-550s: a new 50-seat aircraft being converted from the CRJ-700, starting in the summer of 2019. In February 2020 United Airlines ordered 20 more CRJ-550 aircraft for the GoJet Fleet, to be delivered through 2021.  These aircraft will be transferred from other United Express carriers to GoJet. Once these CRJ-700 aircraft are replaced by the 50-seat, converted aircraft (see below), the CRJ-550 fleet at GoJet will total 74 aircraft.

CRJ-550 Information

The United Express CRJ-550 is a modified Bombardier CRJ-700. Bombardier Aviation does not produce the CRJ-550 new from the factory. Many CRJ-550 aircraft are several years old in the GoJet fleet, the oldest (N503GJ) being close to 20 years old. CRJ-550 conversions are done on both the classic CRJ-700 and the NextGen CRJ-700 models. The process of converting the aircraft cabin is a relatively quick process whereby several economy seats of the -700 series are removed and replaced with large storage cabinets, a larger more modern service galley and updated First Class and Economy Plus seating. The four new cabinets installed at floor level allow passengers to stow larger carry-on luggage in the cabin with them that would normally have needed to be checked planeside when on the CRJ-700. The new, larger service galley allows passengers with first class seats the option of self-serve snacks and beverages during the flight. The galley features a lighted glass cabinet with several snack options, a refrigerator with chilled non-alcoholic beverages, ice and bottled water drawers as well as a waste receptacle. For the cabin crew, the new galley features a storage area for crew luggage. In the cabin, the aircraft features 10 full-size First Class seats, 20 Economy Plus seats and 20 Economy seats. The whole aircraft receives new wall panels, carpeting, curtains and signage. United is having all the CRJ-550 aircraft painted in its new blue and white livery. For pilots, the aircraft is essentially a CRJ-700 with limited takeoff and landing weights, in order to meet the United Airlines "scope clause" agreement with its pilots who are represented by the Airline Pilots Association. This agreement limits the CRJ-550 to a maximum takeoff weight of 65,000 pounds: 10,000 pounds less than the CRJ-700. The CRJ-550 is sometimes restricted from taking full passenger-loads when flying into areas where more precautionary fuel is needed, such as areas with poor weather, due to this reduced weight limit.

See also 
 Air transportation in the United States

References

External links

 

2004 establishments in Missouri
Airlines based in Missouri
Airlines established in 2004
Companies based in St. Louis County, Missouri
Privately held companies based in Missouri
Regional Airline Association members
Regional airlines of the United States
American corporate subsidiaries